The Battle of Noviodunum was fought in 369 between the Roman Empire and the Thervingi at Noviodunum, Moesia, modern-day Romania. At this time, the leader of the Thervingi, Athanaric was threatening northern Greece. Having repulsed the invaders at Daphne, Emperor Valens secured a decisive victory against Athanaric at Noviodunum. In September 369, Athanaric accepted an advantageous treaty with Valens, but peace between the Goths and the Romans would turn short-lived.

Sources
 

369
Noviodunum
Noviodunum
Military history of Romania
History of Tulcea County
Noviodunum